Andrew Umfray was a 14th-century bishop-elect of Dunkeld. He had been the precentor of Dunkeld when, following the death of Bishop Michael de Monymusk, Andrew was elected as the new bishop. He travelled to the Apostolic See to receive consecration, and was provided to the see of Dunkeld on 17 June 1377 by Pope Gregory XI. He died at the papal court, probably before receiving consecration.

References
Dowden, John, The Bishops of Scotland, ed. J. Maitland Thomson, (Glasgow, 1912)

14th-century births
1377 deaths
Bishops of Dunkeld (non consecrated, titular or doubtful)
14th-century Scottish Roman Catholic bishops